The 2020 USL League Two season was to have been the 26th season of the USL League Two, the top pre-professional soccer league in the United States, since its establishment in 1995. Flint City Bucks were the defending champions after defeating Reading United in the National Championship the previous season.

The regular season was scheduled to start on May 3 and conclude on July 17. There would have been a record of 81 teams participating in this season.

On April 30, 2020 the season was canceled due to the COVID-19 pandemic.

Team changes

New teams
 AFC Ann Arbor
 Asheville City
 Bascome Bermuda
 Colorado Rush SC
 East Atlanta FC
 Grand Rapids FC
 Louisville City FC U23
 New Mexico United U23
 Oakland County
 Peoria City
 Philadelphia Lone Star
 South Bend Lions
 Southern Soccer Academy
 Tampa Bay Rowdies U-23
 TFA Willamette
 West Chester United

Departing teams
 Albuquerque Sol FC
 
 Fresno U-23
 Lakeland Tropics
 Orange County U-23
 San Diego Zest
 Victoria Highlanders

Name changes

Teams

Notes:
On April 10, 2020, Three Heartland Teams withdrawn for 2020 season due to COVID-19 Pandemic and will return for 2021.
On April 17, 2020, FC Bascome Bermuda takes a hiatus for 2020 season due to COVID-19 Pandemic and will return for 2021.
On April 22, 2020, the Metropolitan Division withdrawn for 2020 season due to COVID-19 Pandemic and will return for 2021.

References

External links
 USL League Two website

2020
2020 in American soccer leagues
2020 in Canadian soccer
Association football events cancelled due to the COVID-19 pandemic